Garbadadar District is a district in the northwestern Salal region of Somaliland.  Its formation was announced by the President of Somaliland, Dahir Riyale Kahin, in March 2008.

See also
Administrative divisions of Somaliland
Regions of Somaliland
Districts of Somaliland

References

Districts of Somalia
Awdal